Megisthanus is a genus of predatory mites in the  family Megisthanidae. There are at least four described species in Megisthanus.

Species
These four species belong to the genus Megisthanus:
 Megisthanus floridanus Banks
 Megisthanus jacobsoni Warburton
 Megisthanus orientalis Oudemans, 1905
 Megisthanus postsetosus Karg, 1996

References

External links

 

Acari